Ned Reeves (born 31 October 1998) is a professional Australian rules footballer with the Hawthorn Football Club in the Australian Football League (AFL).

Early career

Reeves was always a tall boy for his age. Growing up on the Surf Coast in Fairhaven, Ned played his junior football with the Aireys Inlet Eels in the Football Geelong Junior Competition and the Anglesea FNC until he moved to Melbourne at age 15. Ned attended Aireys Inlet primary school and St Josephs College, Geelong before St Kevins College, Toorak.
He was the tallest boy in the NAB Under 18 League, playing for Oakleigh Chargers, but he wasn't drafted. He played the 2018 year in the VAFA for St Kevins Old Boys. He played in the Premier League premiership team.
His father is the  CEO, Justin Reeves, and the club invited him for pre-season training.

AFL career

Reeves' AFL career started by playing with the Hawthorn affiliate Box Hill Hawks in the Victorian Football League (VFL). In 2021 he was considered one of the most in-form ruckmen in the VFL competition and made his AFL debut against  at the MCG, becoming Hawthorn's tallest ever player.

Statistics
Updated to the end of the 2022 season.

|-
| 2019 ||  || 47
| 0 || — || — || — || — || — || — || — || — || — || — || — || — || — || — || — ||  — || 0
|-
| 2020 ||  || 43
| 0 || — || — || — || — || — || — || — || — || — || — || — || — || — || — || — || — || 0 
|-
| 2021 ||  || 37
| 5 || 1 || 0 || 19 || 29 || 48 || 8 || 20 || 131 || 0.2 || 0.0 || 3.8 || 5.8 || 9.6 || 1.6 || 4.0 || 26.2 || 0
|-
| 2022 ||  || 37
| 12 || 7 || 1 || 53 || 36 || 89 || 17 || 29 || 323 || 0.6 || 0.1 || 4.4 || 3.0 || 7.4 || 1.4 || 2.4 || 26.9 || 0
|- class="sortbottom"
! colspan=3| Career
! 17 !! 8 !! 1 !! 72 !! 65 !! 137 !! 25 !! 49 !! 454 !! 0.5 !! 0.1 !! 4.2 !! 3.8 !! 8.1 !! 1.5 !! 2.9 !! 26.7 !! 0
|}

Honours and achievements 
Individual
  most promising player: 2022

Notes

References

External links

Living people
1998 births
Hawthorn Football Club players
Box Hill Football Club players
Australian rules footballers from Victoria (Australia)
Oakleigh Chargers players